Between Friends (Canadian title: Nobody Makes Me Cry) is a 1983 American-Canadian made-for-television drama film starring Elizabeth Taylor and Carol Burnett, based on the 1975 novel Nobody Makes Me Cry by Shelley List. The film premiered in the United States as Between Friends on HBO on September 11, 1983, and was broadcast in Canada as Nobody Makes Me Cry on First Choice (Pay-TV) on October 5, 1983. The film was directed by Lou Antonio.

Plot
Mary Catherine Castelli is a fifty-year-old real estate agent whose husband left her for a younger woman; since then she's been making up for lost time with short term relationships with a number of men, some of whom are married. Deborah Shapiro is also middle-aged and newly divorced, though she is still coming to terms with being single again and has had little luck finding a new beau. Mary and Deborah meet literally by accident when they get into a fender-bender outside Mary's office, but the two soon strike up a friendship after Deborah asks Mary to help her sell her house. Together, Mary and Deborah help each other deal with their new lives as single women, the difficulty of getting back into the dating pool, and the mildly terrifying onset of middle age and menopause.

Cast

Production
Between Friends was filmed in Toronto, Ontario, Canada from February to March 1983.

Awards and nominations

References

External links

1983 television films
1983 films
1983 drama films
American buddy drama films
Canadian drama television films
English-language Canadian films
HBO Films films
Films shot in Toronto
1980s female buddy films
Films directed by Lou Antonio
American drama television films
1980s American films
1980s Canadian films
Films scored by James Horner